The Naylor-Leyland Baronetcy, of Hyde Park House, Albert Gate, in the County of London, is a title in the Baronetage of the United Kingdom. It was created on 31 August 1895 for Herbert Naylor-Leyland, Conservative Member of Parliament for Colchester from 1892 to 1895 and Liberal Member of Parliament for Southport from 1898 to 1899. The second Baronet served as Sheriff of Denbighshire in 1921.

The first baronet took his title from Hyde Park House (60 Knightsbridge, now the Royal Thames Yacht Club), a mansion built in 1855 for his grandfather, the banker Thomas Leyland, by Thomas Cubitt.

Naylor-Leyland baronets, of Hyde Park House (1895)

Sir Herbert Scarisbrick Naylor-Leyland, 1st Baronet (1864–1899). He was married to an American heiress, Jeanie Willson Chamberlain, daughter of William Selah Chamberlain of Cleveland, Ohio, and had two sons by her. The eldest and only surviving son was:

Sir Albert Edward Herbert Naylor-Leyland, 2nd Baronet (6 December 1890 – 23 September 1952), a godson of King Edward VII
Sir Vivyan (or Vyvian) Edward Naylor-Leyland, 3rd Baronet (5 March 1924 – 2 September 1987, Guernsey)
Sir Philip Vyvyan Naylor-Leyland, 4th Baronet (born 9 August 1953), of Nantclwyd Hall, Ruthin, North Wales and Milton Hall, Peterborough, Cambridgeshire
 Thomas Philip Naylor-Leyland (born 1982), is heir apparent

References
Kidd, Charles, Williamson, David (editors). Debrett's Peerage and Baronetage (1990 edition). New York: St Martin's Press, 1990.

Naylor-Leyland
Llanelidan
Naylor-Leyland family